Eugnorisma is a genus of moths of the family Noctuidae.

Species

Eugnorisma arenoflavida Schawerda, 1934
Eugnorisma chaldaica Boisduval, 1840
Eugnorisma depuncta Linnaeus, 1761
Eugnorisma glareosa Esper, 1788
Eugnorisma ignoratum Varga and Ronkay, 1994
Eugnorisma insignata Lederer, 1853
Eugnorisma jubilans Varga, Ronkay, and Guylai, 1995
Eugnorisma miniago Freyer, 1839
Eugnorisma pontica Staudinger, 1891
Eugnorisma puengeleri Varga and Ronkay, 1987

References
Natural History Museum Lepidoptera genus database
Eugnorisma at funet

 
Noctuinae